Viktor Vyacheslavovich Panchenko is a former Russian footballer who was the top scorer of the Russian Top Division in 1993. He scored 21 goals for KAMAZ Naberezhnye Chelny.

Viktor Panchenko shares the record for most goals in a match of Russian Premier League, having scored five against Spartak Vladikavkaz on 26 March 1994. The only other player to achieve this is Oleg Veretennikov. Panchenko is the third best all-time goalscorer for KAMAZ (57 goals).

After finishing his player career Panchenko became a FIFA agent. On December 6, 2010, he was appointed the head scout of FC Dynamo Moscow.

His son Kirill Panchenko is a professional footballer.

External links
 History of FC KAMAZ

References

1963 births
Living people
People from Georgiyevsk
Soviet footballers
Russian footballers
Russian football managers
FC Chernomorets Novorossiysk players
FC KAMAZ Naberezhnye Chelny players
FC Lokomotiv Moscow players
FC Metallurg Lipetsk players
Russian Premier League players
Association football forwards
FC Dynamo Stavropol players
Sportspeople from Stavropol Krai